Arkwright House is a Grade-II listed building in Manchester, England. Designed by local architects, Harry S. Fairhurst, it was completed by 1937 for the English Sewing Cotton Company. Arkwright House is built in a neo-classical style with some art deco motifs which was widely prominent during the 1930s.

Arkwright House was heavily damaged in the 1992 Manchester bombing and needed work to repair the building. It is marked by it giant Corinthian order columns and the use of Portland stone as the exterior. The building has been described as 'sinister' by one architecture critic, suggesting it shares some similarities with Nazi architecture where classical buildings were preferred. Hartwell describes the front façade facing Parsonage Gardens as architecturally 'impressive'.

References

External links
Current website for Arkwright House Offices Manchester 

Grade II listed buildings in Manchester
Houses completed in 1937
Neoclassical architecture in England